or the Eiffel Tower is a wrought-iron lattice tower on the Champ de Mars in Paris, France.

Tour Eiffel may also refer to:
 La Tour Eiffel (Hopi Hari), a drop tower at the Hopi Hari amusement park in Vinhedo, Sao Paulo, Brazil
 Le Tour Eiffel (EP), a 2007 extended play record by Siouxsie
 Champ de Mars – Tour Eiffel station, a transit station in Paris, France
 Tour Eiffel Bridge, a bridge in Gatineau, Quebec, Canada
 "The Eiffel Tour", a 2009 concert tour by Art vs. Science
 La tour Eiffel, an 1898 painting by Henri Rousseau

See also

 Eiffel (disambiguation)
 Eiffel Tower (disambiguation)
 List of songs about Paris, listing several songs named "Tour Eiffel"
 Ramada Paris Tour Eiffel, a hotel